Libelluloidea is a superfamily of dragonflies.

A 2007 phylogenetic analysis suggests that this superfamily contains four families:

Corduliidae
Gomphomacromiidae
Libellulidae
Macromiidae

Some authors include other families here, including Synthemistidae and the monotypic Neopetaliidae.

References

 
Dragonflies
Insect superfamilies